G. floribunda may refer to:

 Galphimia floribunda, a Mexican plant
 Garuga floribunda, an incense tree
 Grevillea floribunda, a shrub endemic to Australia